Karl Heinrich Lübke (14 October 1894 – 6 April 1972) was a German politician, who served as president of West Germany from 1959 to 1969. 

He suffered from deteriorating health towards the end of his career and is known for a series of embarrassing incidents that may have resulted from his health issues. Lübke resigned three months before the scheduled end of his second term amid a scandal as to his involvement with the Nazi regime during World War II.

Early life

Born in Enkhausen, Westphalia, Lübke had a very humble upbringing. He was the son of a shoemaker and farmer from the Sauerland, and was a surveyor by training. He volunteered for service in World War I in August 1914. He completed his basic training first with the Westphalian Foot Artillery Regiment No.7, with which he was then deployed on the Eastern and Western Fronts. In 1916 he was promoted to Vizefeldwebel. After a gas attack, he was taken to a field hospital. In 1917 he was promoted to lieutenant and became deputy battery chief in the 52nd Reserve Division. He then became an orderly officer and was involved in the Battle of Passchendaele. Before the end of the war he was transferred to the GHQ of the Supreme Army Command. During the war he received the Iron Cross 1st and 2nd class. He was discharged from military service in December 1918.

Lübke resumed his studies and received an examination as a surveying and cultural engineer in 1921. During his studies in Bonn he joined the student association K.D.St.V. Ascania Bonn in the Cartellverband. From 1921 to 1924 he studied economics in Münster and Berlin. From 1921 to 1922 he was employed by the Westphalia tenants and settlers association in Münster. From October 1922 he was managing director of the Reich Association of Small Agricultural Enterprises (from 1925 also medium-sized enterprises). After 1924 he was also a member of the executive committee of the Deutscher Bund für Bodenreform. In 1926 he became managing director of the Deutsche Bauernschaft. From 1927 he was also the managing director of the Bauernland AG settlement company.

In 1929 Lübke married Wilhelmine Keuthen (1885-1981) in Berlin-Wilmersdorf.

In 1930 he became a member of the Roman Catholic Centre Party (Zentrumspartei) and in April 1932 was elected as a member of the Prussian Parliament. From 1932 to 1933 Lübke was a member of the Prussian state parliament for the German Center Party . He was re-elected in the state elections on March 5, 1933. On May 18, 1933, as in the Reich, the state parliament approved an enabling law for Prussia against the votes of the SPD. After that, it never met again. On October 14, 1933, the representative bodies of the federal states were dissolved and finally repealed without replacement on January 30, 1934.

After the seizure of power by the National Socialists in 1933 and the subsequent dissolution of the Zentrumspartei, Lübke was accused of misappropriating public funds and imprisoned; after 20 months in prison he was released, when no evidence could be produced to back up the politically motivated charges. It was not until 1937 that he was able to get a senior position with a building society (German: Wohnungsbaugesellschaft). In 1939, just before the outbreak of World War II, he moved to a company of building engineers managed by the architect Walter Schlempp. Here he came to the notice of Albert Speer and was given responsibility for major building projects, some of which were under the aegis of the Armaments Ministry run by Speer. One of these was the extension of the 'Army Research Center Peenemünde' (Heeresversuchsanstalt Peenemünde in German, abbreviated HVP) and the 'Air Force Test Centre' (Erprobungsstelle der Luftwaffe in German), Peenemünde-West. In February 1945 Lübke was charged by Speer with setting up a "post-war office for planning prefabricated housing" alongside architect Rudolf Wolters.

He performed three military exercises in the Wehrmacht as a reserve officer and was promoted to first lieutenant in the reserve. In 1942 he was promoted to captain of the reserve.

Post-war political career
After the war, Lübke returned to his career in politics, becoming a member of the West German CDU party, being appointed Minister of Agriculture in the state parliament of North Rhine-Westphalia in 1947. In 1953 Konrad Adenauer appointed him to his cabinet as Federal Minister of Agriculture in Bonn.

Lübke was chosen by Adenauer as a candidate for the largely ceremonial post of president to ensure that Adenauer's political schemes were not disturbed by too strong a personality in this position, which is nominally the highest post in the German state. Lübke defeated Carlo Schmid, the SPD candidate, and Max Becker, the FDP candidate for the presidency, in the second round of voting in 1959.

On 1 July 1964 , he was re-elected by the Fourth Federal Convention. The re-election was preceded by a meeting between Lübke and Herbert Wehner (SPD) during a cure in Bad Kissingen, at which both agreed on re-election and spoke out in favor of a grand coalition. Only then did Lübke inform the CDU and was confirmed in office with the votes of both major parties. The State Secretary in the Office of the Federal President, Hans von Herwarth, who had internally opposed a second term in office because of Lübke's state of health, was subsequently replaced and sent to Rome as ambassador. Lübke campaigned for the formation of the Grand Coalition (Kiesinger cabinet).

The historian Tony Judt has observed that Lübke's presidency, like the chancellorship of Kurt Georg Kiesinger, showed the "a glaring contradiction in the Bonn Republic's self-image" in view of their previous Nazi allegiances. Lübke's status as a one-time political prisoner under the National Socialists placed him in good stead, and it was not until 1966 that accusations started to be made by sources in the GDR that he had at the very least been aware of the use of slave labour on his projects; building plans bearing his signature and containing concentration camp barrack blocks were advanced as evidence of his complicity, but these were dismissed in the West as East German and Eastern Bloc propaganda. Nevertheless, the potential scandal threatened to damage the office of president; on 14 October 1968 Lübke announced that he would resign on 30 June 1969, his resignation taking effect three months before the scheduled end of his term of office.

The former president's health deteriorated. His intention to live in West Berlin from time to time could not be realized, nor could he, with his private library of about 5,000 books, pursue his scientific hobbies in comparative linguistics and microbiology.

Lübke's political friends ignored him, if they did not avoid him. His successor in the presidency, Gustav Heinemann, however, kept in contact with him. Trips to Tenerife in the fall of 1969 and at Christmas in 1970 and 1971 brought no improvement in his condition. Arteriosclerosis of the arteries in both his brain and his limbs was becoming increasingly noticeable, leading to serious speech disorders, declining physical mobility, and progressive memory loss. In retrospect, it was clear that this disease had started several years earlier and explained many aspects of the West German president's behaviour during his last years in office. In November 1971, the former president visited his birthplace in Enkhausen for the last time.

On 30 March 1972, an acute stomach hemorrhage required an emergency operation during which it was discovered that he was suffering from a very advanced form of stomach cancer which had already spread to his brain. After two more hemorrhages, Lübke died on 6 April 1972 at the age of 77 in the West German capital of Bonn.

As a speaker
Lübke was a poor public speaker and was frequently subject to ridicule, especially near the end of his term of office when his age and his failing health started to affect his memory and general cognitive abilities. He frequently forgot where he was (Lübke: "When I talk to you today in...eh... in.." Voice from the crowd shouting: "Helmstedt!" Lübke: "...eh...when I talk to you today in ... Helmstedt, then it was following my own will...", etc.). This was further ridiculed in the German translation of Danger Mouse, where Penfold is called "Lübke" and is frequently ordered to "shut up" ("Lübke, Schnauze!").

Various other slips are well documented, such as the address in Antananarivo, Madagascar: "My very dear Mr. President, dear Mrs. Tananarive..."  His word-for-word translations of German into English (see Lübke English) were also the subject of much mockery.

Tapes from Lübke's speeches were collected by the German satirical magazine Pardon and distributed on a best-selling record.

Honours

National honour
 :
 Grand Cross Special Class (and former Grand Master) of the Order of Merit of the Federal Republic of West Germany

Foreign honours
 :
 Grand Cordon of the Order of Valour
  Ethiopia:
 Knight of the Order of Solomon
 :
 Grand Cross of the Order of the Legion of Honour
  Iran:
 First Class with Collar of the Order of Pahlavi
:
 Honorary Recipient of the Most Exalted Order of the Crown of the Realm
 :
 Grand Collar (Raja) of the Order of Sikatuna
 :
 Knight of the Order of the Rajamitrabhorn
 Knight Grand Cordon (Special Class) of the Order of Chula Chom Klao
 :
 Honorary Knight Grand Cross of the Order of the Bath

References

 
1894 births
1972 deaths
20th-century presidents of Germany
Agriculture ministers of Germany
Centre Party (Germany) politicians
German Roman Catholics
Members of the Bundestag for North Rhine-Westphalia
Members of the Bundestag 1957–1961
Members of the Bundestag 1953–1957
Members of the Bundestag 1949–1953
German hunters
People from the Province of Westphalia
People from Sundern
Presidents of Germany
Grand Crosses Special Class of the Order of Merit of the Federal Republic of Germany
Knights Grand Cross with Collar of the Order of Merit of the Italian Republic
Members of the Landtag of North Rhine-Westphalia
German Army personnel of World War I
Honorary Knights Grand Cross of the Order of the Bath
Deaths from stomach cancer
Members of the Bundestag for the Christian Democratic Union of Germany
Recipients of orders, decorations, and medals of Ethiopia